Tatton is a civil parish in the Borough of Cheshire East and ceremonial county of Cheshire in England. It lies to the north of Knutsford and mostly covers Tatton Park. At the 2001 census, it had a population of 35. The parish does not have a parish council or parish meeting.

See also

 Listed buildings in Tatton, Cheshire
 Tatton Park
 Tatton Park Gardens
 Tatton Park Flower Show

References

Civil parishes in Cheshire